Maxime Lagarde (born 16 March 1994) is a French chess grandmaster. He won the French Chess Championship in 2019.

Chess career
Born in 1994, Lagarde earned his international master title in 2011 and his grandmaster title in 2013. He is the No. 5 ranked French player 

Lagarde finished second at the 2018 Reykjavik Open, scoring 7/9 (+6–1=2). He won the French Chess Championship in 2019. He placed joint-first with 6/9 (+4–1=4), and defeated Laurent Fressinet on tiebreak to take the title.

In 2020, Lagarde won the 22nd Trieste Festival.

References

External links
 
 
 

1994 births
Living people
Chess grandmasters
French chess players
People from Niort
Sportspeople from Deux-Sèvres